Ismail Mohammed may refer to:
Ismail Mohammed Sharif (born 1962), Iraqi footballer
Ismail Mohammed (football coach) (1922–2008), Iraqi football coach

See also 
Ismaeel Mohammad (born 1990), Qatari professional footballer
Ismail Mohamed (disambiguation)